"Sugar (Gimme Some)" is a song by American rapper Trick Daddy featuring fellow American rapper Ludacris & American singer CeeLo Green, released as the second single  from the former's sixth studio album Thug Matrimony: Married to the Streets (2004). Produced by Mike Caren, the single was certified Gold by the RIAA.

Remix
The official remix replaces Trick Daddy's second verse with a verse by Lil' Kim. There is a second version that has Trick Daddy's 2nd verse after Lil' Kim's.

Music video
The video for "Sugar" is the remix version with Lil' Kim & Cee-Lo Green, but Ludacris was absent on the video so his verse from the song was omitted from the video. In 2004, the video was shot in Miami, and was directed by Haugesunder.

Original version
Trick Daddy covered the Talking Heads song "Sugar on My Tongue".

Track listings
US digital download
"Sugar (Gimme Some)" (featuring Ludacris, Lil' Kim and Cee-Lo) – 4:06

Australian CD single
"Sugar (Gimme Some)" (album version) – 4:05
"Sugar (Gimme Some)" (amended album version) – 4:05
"Sugar (Gimme Some)" (remix) (featuring Lil' Kim and Cee-Lo) – 3:34
"Sugar (Gimme Some)" (remix) (featuring Ludacris, Lil' Kim and Cee-Lo) – 4:06

European CD single
"Sugar (Gimme Some)" (album version) – 4:05
"Sugar (Gimme Some)" (remix) (featuring Ludacris, Lil' Kim and Cee-Lo) – 4:07

Charts

Weekly charts

Year-end charts

Certifications

Release history

References

2005 singles
CeeLo Green songs
Ludacris songs
Trick Daddy songs
Songs written by Ludacris
Dirty rap songs
Songs written by David Byrne

Songs written by Trick Daddy